Guéméné may refer to:
 Guémené-sur-Scorff, commune in Morbihan, Brittany, France
 Guémené-Penfao, commune in Loire-Atlantique, France
 Prince of Guéméné, French noble title within the House of Rohan, derived from Guémené-sur-Scorff

Similar spellings
 Quemener, Breton surname
 Gemenea, river and villages in Romania